The following is about the qualification rules and the quota allocation for the short track speed skating at the 2018 Winter Olympics.

Qualification rules
A total quota of 120 athletes were allowed to compete at the Games (60 men and 60 women). Countries were assigned quotas based on their performance during the 2017–18 ISU Short Track Speed Skating World Cup. Each nation was permitted to enter a maximum of five athletes per gender if it qualified a relay team and three if it did not. Hosts South Korea were guaranteed the full quota of ten athletes. There were a maximum of thirty-two qualifiers for the 500m and 1000m events; thirty-six for the 1500m events; and eight for the relays.

Quota allocation
Final quotas were published by the ISU on 23 November 2017. North Korea was allowed to add two entries on 20 January 2018.

Great Britain and Kazakhstan received reallocated spots in the men's 1500m and Kazakhstan received the men's relay spot initially awarded to OAR.  Team OAR remained qualified in the women's relay, but only used four of the available five quotas.

Relays
Nations could compete in four world cup races, and were ranked by their three best scores.  Bolded nations are qualified.

Individual distances
The first placed racer (per nation) was ranked based on the three best world cup results, out of four, for each race.  This means that multiple skaters could have a part in that score, and ranking.  The second and third best were ranked in the same way. For the 500m and 1000m the top 32 qualified, and for the 1500m the top 36 qualified.  The next best six nations for each race are shown.

References

Qualification
Qualification for the 2018 Winter Olympics